The 1969 Penn Quakers football team was an American football team that represented the University of Pennsylvania during the 1969 NCAA University Division football season. Penn tied for fifth in the Ivy League. 

In their fifth year under head coach Bob Odell, the Quakers compiled a 4–5 record and were outscored 185 to 104. George Joseph was the team captain.

Penn's 2-5 conference record tied for fifth-best in the Ivy League. The Quakers were outscored 161 to 63 by Ivy opponents. 

Penn played its home games at Franklin Field on the university's campus in Philadelphia, Pennsylvania.

Schedule

References

Penn
Penn Quakers football seasons
Penn Quakers football